"Crying Time" is a song from 1964 written and originally recorded by the American country music artist Buck Owens. It gained greater success in the version recorded by Ray Charles, which won two Grammy Awards in 1967.  Numerous other cover versions have been performed and recorded over the intervening years.

History
Owens recorded the original version of his song and released it as the B side to the 45 single "I've Got a Tiger By the Tail" in 1964, Capitol 5336, but it failed to reach the music charts. A cover version of "Crying Time" was then recorded by R&B singer Ray Charles, and his version proved to be a hit. Featuring backing vocals by the Jack Halloran Singers and The Raelettes, the song reached number six on the Billboard Hot 100 chart in February 1966. Charles' version of the song also peaked at number five on the R&B chart and spent three weeks at number one on the easy listening chart. In the United Kingdom, the song reached number 50 on the UK Singles Chart. In addition, Charles' version of "Crying Time" won two Grammy Awards in 1967, in the categories Best R&B Recording and Best R&B Solo Performance.

Style
Charles intended his version of Owens' song to be a tribute to the country music style he appreciated (Charles had successfully covered other country music songs in the past, such as "I Can't Stop Loving You"). He was quoted as saying that he didn't record "Crying Time" and other country songs written by Owens "out of disrespect for Buck. I'm crazy about Buck. But I heard something that fit my style. The key was keeping my style while watching my style work in different ways."

Chart history

Weekly charts

Year-end charts

Cover versions
Nancy Sinatra recorded a cover of the song for the 1966 album How Does That Grab You?.
Dean Martin recorded the song for his 1969 album I Take a Lot of Pride in What I Am
Elvis Presley I never got to record it in a studio, but I perform it sometimes in the summer season: August 1970 in Las Vegas.
Tammy Wynette and George Jones recorded the song, which can be found on the album: Tammy Wynette Live at Church Street Station.
Ray Charles and Barbra Streisand memorably performed the song as a duet on her 1973 soundtrack album from her CBS television special Barbra Streisand...and Other Musical Instruments. This cover was featured in the episode "The Glass Is Always Cleaner" of the drama series Las Vegas. Streisand also included a solo version of the song on her 1974 album ButterFly.
Lorrie Morgan recorded a cover of the song for the soundtrack to the 1993 film The Beverly Hillbillies. Her version peaked at number 59 on the Billboard Hot Country Singles & Tracks chart.
Andre Hazes recorded the song with new Dutch lyrics for his 1989 blues album Dit Is Wat Ik Wil (This Is What I Want) as Jammer (It's a pity), a warning against pollution of the earth. The song, released as a single, features a guitar solo by Jan Akkerman.
Yugoslav band Dinamiti made a recording of their version in 1964, but it remained unpublished until 2005, when it appeared on the box set Kad je rock bio mlad - Priče sa istočne strane (1956-1970) (When Rock Was Young - East Side Stories (1956-1970)), released by Croatia Records and featuring songs by the pioneering Yugoslav rock acts.

See also
List of number-one adult contemporary singles of 1966 (U.S.)

References

1964 songs
1965 singles
Torch songs
Buck Owens songs
Ray Charles songs
Barbra Streisand songs
Lorrie Morgan songs
Songs written by Buck Owens
ABC Records singles